Kouassi Kouadja (born 22 June 1995) is an Ivorian footballer, who plays as a defender for Fovu Club.

Career
In February 2016, Kouadja signed for Kazakhstan Premier League side FC Aktobe.

On 29 March 2017, Kouadja re-signed for FC Slutsk, leaving the club when his contract expired 8 June of the same year.

Career statistics

References

External links
 

1995 births
Living people
Footballers from Abidjan
Ivorian footballers
Association football defenders
Ivorian expatriate footballers
Liga I players
Kazakhstan Premier League players
Expatriate footballers in Moldova
Ivorian expatriate sportspeople in Moldova
Expatriate footballers in Romania
Ivorian expatriate sportspeople in Romania
Expatriate footballers in Belarus
Ivorian expatriate sportspeople in Belarus
Expatriate footballers in Kazakhstan
Ivorian expatriate sportspeople in Kazakhstan
Expatriate footballers in Russia
Ivorian expatriate sportspeople in Russia
Expatriate soccer players in South Africa
Ivorian expatriate sportspeople in South Africa
Expatriate footballers in Cameroon
FC Astra Giurgiu players
FC Saxan players
FC Slutsk players
FC Aktobe players
Cape Town City F.C. (2016) players
FC Tambov players
Renaissance FC de Ngoumou players
Fovu Baham players